Agbogbloshie is a nickname of a commercial district on the Korle Lagoon of the Odaw River, near the center of Accra, Ghana's capital city in the Greater Accra region. Near the slum called "Old Fadama", the Agbogbloshie site became known as a destination for externally generated automobile and electronic scrap collected from mostly the western world.  It was alleged to be at the center of a legal and illegal exportation network for the environmental dumping of electronic waste (e-waste) from industrialized nations.  The Basel Action Network, a small NGO based in Seattle, has referred to Agbogbloshie as a "digital dumping ground", where they allege millions of tons of e-waste are processed each year.

However, repeated international studies have failed to confirm the allegations, which have been labelled an "e-waste hoax" by international reuse advocate WR3A.  The most exhaustive study of the trade in used electronics in Nigeria, funded by the United Nations Environment Programme (UNEP) and the Basel Convention, revealed that from 540 000 tonnes of informally processed waste electronics, 52% of the material was recovered.

According to statistics from the World Bank, in large cities like Accra and Lagos, the majority of households have owned televisions and computers for decades.  The UN Report "Where are WEEE in Africa" (2012) disclosed that the majority of used electronics found in African dumps had not in fact been recently imported as scrap, but originated from these African cities.  Agbogbloshie is situated on the banks of the Korle Lagoon, northwest of Accra's Central Business District. Roughly 40,000 Ghanaians inhabit the area, most of whom are migrants from rural areas. Due to its harsh living conditions and rampant crime, the area is nicknamed "Sodom and Gomorrah".

The Basel Convention prevents the transfrontier shipment of hazardous waste from developed to less developed countries.  However, the Convention specifically allows export for reuse and repair under Annex Ix, B1110.  While numerous international press reports have made reference to allegations that the majority of exports to Ghana are dumped, research by the US International Trade Commission found little evidence of unprocessed e-waste being shipped to Africa from the United States, a finding corroborated by the Massachusetts Institute of Technology, Memorial University, Arizona State University, UNEP, and other research. In 2013, the original source of the allegation blaming foreign dumping for the material found in Agbogbloshie recanted, or rather stated it had never made the claim that 80% of US e-waste is exported.

Whether domestically generated by residents of Ghana or imported, concern remains over methods of waste processing - especially burning - which emit toxic chemicals into the air, land and water. Exposure is especially hazardous to children, as these toxins are known to inhibit the development of the reproductive system, the nervous system, and especially the brain. Concerns about human health and the environment of Agbogbloshie continue to be raised as the area remains heavily polluted. In the 2000s, the Ghanaian government, with new funding and loans, implemented the Korle Lagoon Ecological Restoration Project (KLERP), an environmental remediation and restoration project that will address the pollution problem by dredging the lagoon and Odaw canal to improve drainage and flooding into the ocean.

Background

In the 1960s, the slum area of Agbogbloshie was a wetland. As the city of Accra urbanized, a ghetto grew, referred to as Old Fadama or Ayaalolo. During the 1980s, the ghetto was a place of shelter for refugees from the Konkomba-Nanumba war. In the late 1990s, newly available electricity from the Akosombo Dam led to increased local demand for electric and electronic appliance consumption. Critics claim that this caused an imbalanced shift.

The electricity from the Akosombo dam increased demand for functional second-hand televisions and computers, these were imported from the West by Africa's Tech Sector to help ‘bridge the digital divide’. Ghanaians welcomed these donations, because these computers cost one-tenth the price of a new one. The Basel Action Network circulated a claim in 2008 that as much as 75 percent of these second-hand electronics sent to Africa could not be reused and ended up in landfills.

The BAN allegation was slightly different from its 2002 claim of 80% waste which became one of the most cited references in academic journals, though no documentation or peer reviewed source documentation has been made available. In 2013 BAN denied ever making the claim, or ever stating any statistic for African imports.

Economy
The local economy of Agbogbloshie is based on an onion market serving immigrants to Accra from the greater Tamale Region (Dagbani) in the north.  Unemployed immigrants turned to scrap metal collection, including auto scrap, to supplement incomes. Electronic scrap processing is a fairly small activity at the market. The claim that "hundreds of millions of tons of electronic waste are imported to the area each year", as reported by several news sources, is considered by most experts to be utterly ridiculous and preposterous. However, there is evidence that every month, an estimated 300 to 600 40-foot-long containers of e-waste shipments reach the ports of Ghana.

It is not clear if the United States is the leading exporter of e-waste to Ghana, although imports arrive from other countries such as France, Germany, Korea, Switzerland and the Netherlands. Multinational brands such as Philips, Canon, Dell, Microsoft, Nokia, Siemens and Sony are commonly found throughout the waste. According to the E-Waste Assessment Studies, "Refurbishing of EEE and the sales of used EEE is an important economic sector (e.g. Alaba market in Lagos). It is a well-organized and  a dynamic  sector that holds the potential for further industrial development. Indirectly, the sector has another important economic role, as it supplies low and middle income households with affordable ICT equipment and other EEE. In the view of the sector’s positive socio-economic performance, all policy measures aiming to improve e-waste management in Nigeria should refrain from undifferentiated banning of  second-hand imports and refurbishing activities and strive for a co-operative approach by including the market and sector associations."

Followers of BAN have alleged that non-governmental organizations (NGOs) are adding to the waste when excess electronics are donated with the intention of helping scholarly institutions. They claim, based on the 75%-80% orphaned waste statistic, that exporters must have found numerous loopholes to avoid legislation forbidding e-waste shipping, such as labeling broken electronics as ‘end-of-life’ or ‘second-hand-goods’, falsely identifying them as in working order. If it were true that between 50% and 75% of the electronics imported are unable to be salvaged and remain on the land, the import would be illegal.  However, the UN Studies have failed to find evidence of the allegation, and the only source of the dumping statistic has denied it.

Young men burning wires from auto harnesses and electronics have been the subject of several photojournal essays. The workers, mostly young men, disassemble cars, appliances, and scrap electronics gathered in wheeled push carts from Accra neighborhoods. Revenue from the recovery of metals such as copper, aluminum and iron, produce very low wages.  Several British news outlets have made the recycling workers a cause celebre. Photographs of workers burning old wire on top of tires and plastic in order to melt the plastic, or dismantling the waste with their bare hands and stones, have been popularized by the press. Magnets from electronics are shown used to gather the smallest of ferrous metal scraps. The remaining materials are further burned or dumped nearby.

The workers, children and adults alike, sell the metal scraps to earn a living.

The informal e-waste recycling industry is highly hierarchical, with burners, collectors, and dismantlers representing the 'lowest' class often used as an entry point for young people. Obtaining enough knowledge, networking, and capital can then lead to attaining higher ranks. The Greater Accra Scrap Dealers Association (GASDA), an group formed by the workers themselves, establishes certain rules and regulations to be followed, and even cooperates with the National Youth Authority, a governmental organization.

Those who stand to profit the most from their e-waste ending up in Ghana is the European Union. Upwards of 85 per cent of electronics and electrical parts imported into Ghana are from the EU, and a large chunk is dumped as e-waste after entering the country. Only 35 per cent of second-hand and waste electronics in Europe end up in official recycling and collection systems. The reason for this is the cost to comply with EU regulations for discarding e-waste. Avoided costs of compliance with EU regulations (mainly de-pollution), is estimated at €150 million to €600 million (US $165 million to $658 million) annually.

Living conditions
The population of Agbogbloshie consists of economic migrants from northern and rural parts of Ghana, where living standards are growing worse, causing people to move to urban settings, such as Agbogbloshie. Conditions may not be significantly better, but making a living is easier. Inhabitants of Agbogbloshie live, eat, work and relieve themselves on the land and amongst the waste. Children who are able to attend school often spend every evening and weekend processing waste searching for metals.

Dwellings are wooden shacks that lack water and sanitation. The area is also home to armed robbers, prostitutes, drug dealers and others involved in underground markets. Crime and disease run rampant throughout Agbogbloshie, creating an almost uninhabitable environment for humans. Outsiders have nicknamed the area “Sodom and Gomorrah,” after two condemned Biblical cities, due to the harsh living conditions in Agbogbloshie.

Pollution

The dumping and processing of electronic waste in Agbogbloshie continues to severely contaminate the air, land, and water in the entire area at large. Photographs from the Agbogbloshie e-waste landfill show scrap workers openly burning wires from auto harnesses and plastic-encased electronics to recover copper. E-waste contains toxic chemicals that are emitted into the ground, water and atmosphere when the electronics are broken down, burned and processed. Poisons such as lead, mercury, arsenic, dioxins, furans, and brominated flame retardants seep into the surrounding soil and water, thereby seriously polluting the landscape. Greenpeace laboratory tests have shown the water and soil from areas in Agbogbloshie revealed the area contained concentrations of chemicals at levels over a hundred times greater than the allowable amounts.

Several studies have confirmed high levels of lead in the soil, with particular risks to workers and children. Environmental lead contamination is predominantly due to burning off the plastic covering from copper wires. PVC electrical insulation contains approximately 3000 mg/kg lead as a stiffener and ultraviolet inhibitor, and this lead is released during the burning.

The contamination levels of chlorinated and brominated dioxin-related compounds (DRCs) in the soil of Agbogbloshie are among the highest so far reported from informal e-waste recycling sites. Concentrations of several other toxic equivalents regularly exceed action levels set by Japanese, German, or American governments almost three- to seven fold.

The Guardian in April 2019 reported that a study for IPEN and the Basel Action Network found dangerous levels of dioxins and polychlorinated biphenyls (PCBS) in chicken eggs at Agbogbloshie.

Lead-containing glass used in computer monitors (CRT tubes) also contributes to elevated soil lead levels.

The Korle Lagoon, on which Agbogbloshie is situated, has extremely low levels of dissolved oxygen, a result of the large and uncontrolled quantities of domestic and industrial waste being emitted into the water. Studies indicate that the entrance to the lagoon is severely polluted and not suitable for primary or secondary contact, due to the large amounts of bacteria present.

Just one singular egg from a free-range chicken in the area was tested and found to have 220 times the amount of chlorinated dioxins (which can cause cancer and damage the immune system) that is considered safe to consume by the European Food Safety Authority. Because of this, nearly 80,000 inhabitants that live either in or near the Agbogloshie slum are affected by the toxins in the food.

Human health risks
Processing electronic waste presents a serious health threat to workers at Agbogbloshie. The fumes released from the burning of the plastics and metals used in electronics are composed of highly toxic chemicals and carcinogens. Workers often inhale lead, cadmium, dioxins, furans, phthalates and brominated flame retardants.

Exposure to these fumes is especially hazardous to children, as these toxins are known to inhibit the development of the reproductive system, nervous system, and the brain in particular. In similar e-waste processing areas, with conditions and demographics like those of Agbogbloshie, 80% of the children have dangerous levels of lead in their blood. Inhabitants often suffer from chronic nausea, headaches, chest and respiratory problems.

High levels of toxins have also been discovered in soil and food samples, as these chemicals stay in the food chain.

There is evidence that lacking the critical education necessary, electronic waste workers possess little knowledge and awareness about the hazards associated with informal e-waste processing, and some attribute their health issues to other sources, such as malaria or exposure to the sun.

Information security
E-waste presents a potential security threat to individuals and exporting countries. Hard drives that are not properly erased before the computer is disposed of can be reopened, exposing sensitive information. Credit card numbers, private financial data, account information and records of online transactions can be accessed by most willing individuals. Organized criminals in Ghana commonly search the drives for information to use in local scams.

Government contracts have been discovered on hard drives found in Agbogbloshie. Multimillion-dollar agreements from United States security institutions such as the Defense Intelligence Agency (DIA), the Transportation Security Administration and Homeland Security have all resurfaced in Agbogbloshie.

Restoration efforts

The Ghanaian government has made an effort to restore the area through the “Korle Lagoon Ecological Restoration Project” (KLERP). In 2003, the OPEC Fund for International Development, the Arab Bank for Economic Development in Africa, and the Kuwait Fund for Arab Economic Development provided a loan for this project with the expectation that the Ghanaian government dredge the lagoon and restore its surroundings. Other goals of the project include a reduction in flooding, an increase in marine life, an improvement of water quality and an improvement in general sanitary conditions.

Due to the invasive nature of the project, these restoration efforts have been disputed by the inhabitants of Agbogbloshie. The KLERP requires the people to leave the area, which is the only home for a majority of squatters. The Accra Metropolitan Assembly (AMA) has continually tried to evict the people, but have only been met with much resistance. The matter is still in dispute.

In 2014, the NGO Pure Earth (formally Blacksmith Institute) funded the creation of a Copper Wire Recycling Center within Agbogbloshie and helped to install several automated machines to simplify the removal of plastic coating and reduce the burning. Efforts appear to be moderately successful; however, the burning continues.

Since 2017, the German government supports Ghana in introducing sustainable e-waste management in the country. The E-waste programme is implemented by Deutsche Gesellschaft für internationale Zusammenarbeit in partnership with Ghanaian Ministry of Environment Science Technology and Innovation (MESTI). In March 2019 a training facility, a Ghana Health service clinic and a football pitch were completed and commissioned.

References in popular culture
 The official video of the Placebo cover of Talk Talk's song "Life's What You Make It" starts with "This film is dedicated to the workers of Agbogbloshie", and ends with "When you get rid of your cellphone, computer and home appliances, your cast-offs often go on a voyage across the oceans to Agbogbloshie. Agbogbloshie is a former wetland, which is now home to one of the world's largest electronic waste dumps. Here, young men and boys smash and burn electronic devices to salvage the metals inside them". The whole video was shot on site at Agbogbloshie.
 The murder mystery Children of the Street, by Ghanaian author Kwei Quartey, is partially set in Agbogbloshie, and references its e-waste salvaging industry.

See also
Guiyu (town), an electronic waste site in China

References

External links
 Inside a Massive Electronics Graveyard The Atlantic, December 2014
 

Electronic waste in Africa
Electronic waste in Ghana
Landfills
Accra
Data security
Slums in Africa
Squats